Dietrich Nikolaus Winkel (1777 – 28 September 1826) was the inventor of the first successful metronome. He also invented the componium, an "automatic instrument" that could make endless variations on a musical theme.

Winkel was born in Lippstadt, settled in Amsterdam shortly after 1800, and in 1814, while experimenting with pendulums, he discovered that a pendulum weighted on both sides of the pivot could beat steady time, even for the slow tempos often used in European classical music. Winkel donated the first model of his musical 'chronometer', dated 27 November 1814, to the Hollandsch Instituut van Wetenschappen, Letterkunde en Schoone Kunsten in Amsterdam. Unfortunately he did not appropriately protect his idea, and by 1816, Johann Nepomuk Mälzel (sometimes 'Maelzel') added a Scale to the Instrument and patented it as the Mälzel Metronome, which remains in use to this day. Thus, even today Mälzel often incorrectly receives credit for what was rightly Winkel's creation. The original model is preserved in a Dutch museum.

Winkel's death was announced this:

Extensive discussions on the topic of whether Mälzel stole Winkel's intellectual property can be found in the German musical Letters of the time and since. For example:

A German text (would need translation) from 1845 reads: 

Another text (in 1870) wrote of the metronome.

References

1777 births
1826 deaths
19th-century Dutch inventors
19th-century German inventors
Dutch people of German descent
People from Lippstadt
Engineers from Amsterdam